Marian Henryk Szeja (20 August 1941 – 25 February 2015) was a Polish professional footballer who played as a goalkeeper. He was the substitute player for the Poland national team at the 1972 Summer Olympics where Poland won gold medal. Szeja died on 25 February 2015 at the age of 73.

Honours

Club 
AJ Auxerre
 Coupe de France runner-up: 1978/79
 Ligue 2 winner: 1979/80

References

External links 

 

1941 births
2015 deaths
People from Siemianowice Śląskie
Sportspeople from Silesian Voivodeship
Polish footballers
Poland international footballers
Zagłębie Wałbrzych players
Ekstraklasa players
FC Metz players
Ligue 1 players
AJ Auxerre players
Ligue 2 players
Footballers at the 1972 Summer Olympics
Olympic footballers of Poland
Olympic gold medalists for Poland

Medalists at the 1972 Summer Olympics
Association football goalkeepers